Albano Sehn Neto (born 9 June 1997), simply known as Albano, is a Brazilian footballer who plays as a midfielder for Remo, on loan from Goiás.

Club career
Born in São Miguel do Oeste, Santa Catarina, Albano was a Vila Nova youth graduate. After appearing with the first team in a friendly in 2015, he made his senior debut on 9 February 2017, coming on as a second-half substitute in a 2–1 Campeonato Goiano away win over Aparecidense.

On 1 August 2017, after featuring rarely, Albano was loaned to Jataiense. He started the 2018 season on loan at Formosa, before moving to Trindade in July.

After just one match for Trindade, Albano joined Aparecida in September 2018, helping in the club's promotion from the Campeonato Goiano Terceira Divisão. In December, he signed for Aparecidense, but featured in only three matches before serving loans at Votuporanguense and Jataiense during the remainder of the 2019 campaign.

Back to Aparecidense for the 2020 season, Albano was a regular starter and scored eight goals in the 2020 Série D, which included two hat-tricks, against União Rondonópolis (4–2 away win) and São Luiz (4–0 away win). On 20 May 2021, he signed a three-year contract with Goiás.

Career statistics

References

1997 births
Living people
Sportspeople from Santa Catarina (state)
Brazilian footballers
Association football midfielders
Campeonato Brasileiro Série B players
Campeonato Brasileiro Série D players
Vila Nova Futebol Clube players
Trindade Atlético Clube players
Associação Atlética Aparecidense players
Clube Atlético Votuporanguense players
Goiás Esporte Clube players